The year 1772 in architecture involved some significant architectural events and new buildings.

Events
 January 27 – The Pantheon, London, designed by James Wyatt, opens to the public (demolished 1937).

Buildings and structures

Buildings completed
 Adelphi Buildings, London, designed by Robert Adam and his brothers.
 Basilica of the Fourteen Holy Helpers (Basilika Vierzehnheiligen) in Bavaria.
 Cathedral of Hajdúdorog, Hungary.
 Dragon House (Sanssouci) in Potsdam, by command of King Frederick the Great.
 Old Stone Fort (Schoharie, New York), built as a Reformed Dutch church.
 Brick Market, Newport, Rhode Island, designed by Peter Harrison (begun 1762).

Births
 February 16 – Friedrich Gilly, German architect, son of David Gilly (died 1800)
 June 8 – Robert Stevenson, Scottish lighthouse engineer (died 1850)
 John Foulston, English architect working in Plymouth (died 1841)
 Edward Gyfford, English architect (died after 1851)

Deaths
 March 10 – Martin Schmid, Swiss Jesuit missionary, architect and musician (born 1694)
 March 21 – Alexander Kokorinov, Russian architect and teacher (born 1726)
 October 19 – Andrea Belli, Maltese architect and businessman (born 1703)

References

Architecture
Years in architecture
18th-century architecture